Asperula podlechii is a species of flowering plant in the family Rubiaceae. It was first described in  2005 and is endemic to Afghanistan.

References 

podlechii
Taxa named by Eva Schönbeck-Temesy
Flora of Afghanistan